World of Tomorrow is an avant-garde animated science fiction short film series written, directed, produced, animated, and edited by Don Hertzfeldt. The series began with World of Tomorrow (2015), which was followed by World of Tomorrow Episode Two: The Burden of Other People's Thoughts (2017) and World of Tomorrow Episode Three: The Absent Destinations of David Prime (2020).

The series features the voice of Julia Pott, frequently alongside Hertzfeldt's four-year-old niece Winona Mae, who was recorded while drawing and playing. Her spontaneous, natural vocal reactions and questions were then edited into the story to create her character.

The first film was nominated for Best Animated Short Film at the 2015 Academy Awards. In 2020, Indiewire called it "one of the greatest short films in the history of movies." Of the "dreamy, beloved" ongoing series, The Film Stage noted, "Hertzfeldt has crafted what might be the crowning achievement of modern science fiction."

Plot

World of Tomorrow (2015)
A communication unit in a white room begins to ring, and a little girl (voiced by Winona Mae) runs toward the machine, where she excitedly presses a random series of buttons on the console until a live video transmission appears on the screen.

The person in the transmission is a woman (voiced by Julia Pott) and addresses the young girl as Emily. Speaking in a robotic monotone throughout their entire conversation, the woman introduces herself as an adult third-generation clone of Emily contacting her from 227 years in the future. The clone Emily then explains to the original Emily regarding the complex cloning process that humans have devised in an attempt to achieve immortality, as well as describing other crude forms of life extension that less affluent members of humanity can afford. The clone Emily goes on to explain how she was able to contact the original Emily through an experimental and dangerous form of physical time travel. The clone Emily proceeds to transport the original Emily into the clone's present time in the future via time travel.

The original Emily disappears from the white room and reappears inside an interactive space that the clone Emily describes as "the Outernet": a neural network that is a technologically advanced version of the Internet. At this point, the clone Emily begins to address her original as Emily Prime. The clone Emily and Emily Prime briefly engage in drawing simple figures in the air, before the clone Emily invites Emily Prime to view a selection of her memories.

The first memory is one from the clone Emily's childhood, involving a controversial exhibit in a museum where a male clone without a brain, nicknamed affectionately by the public as David, was kept in stasis; she recalls her frequent visits to David over the years and expresses her sadness when he finally died at the age of 72. Other memories the pair visit involve various jobs and loves of Emily's both on the moon and in outer space.

Upon her return to Earth, the clone Emily opened an art gallery that displayed anonymous memories as exhibits. It was in her art gallery that she met her husband: a descendant clone of David, the male clone who was displayed in a museum when she was a child. But as Emily Clone notes, her husband showed many signs of deterioration due to being a clone stemming from a much older generation. Their marriage was brief, as Emily Clone states that her husband died suddenly; thus, ending the David clone lineage. Emily Clone proceeded to harvest her deceased husband's memories, and reflects upon the memories of their relationship with feelings of melancholia.

In the final memory, the clone Emily reveals that in sixty days, Earth will be destroyed by a meteoroid. The clone Emily returns them both to the Outernet and reveals the true reason that she contacted Emily Prime: to retrieve an important memory from her original source before she is to die. The clone uses a handheld device to extract a memory of the original Emily and her mother walking together, which the clone Emily had forgotten. With the memory successfully retrieved, the clone Emily graciously thanks her original and adds that the specific memory will comfort her in the days leading to the destruction of Earth.

As the Outernet slowly begins to disintegrate around them, the clone Emily tells Emily Prime that she is honored to have met Emily Prime and that she will not contact her again. After saying goodbye, Emily Prime is accidentally transported by her clone into the distant past where she is seen standing in a grassy field surrounded by falling snow. She is then transported back into her present timeline, into the white room containing the communication unit where she answered the clone Emily's call. Emily Prime surveys the familiar space with a smile and notes in a singsong voice on "what a happy day it is" before she scampers out of the room.

Episode Two: The Burden of Other People's Thoughts (2017)
Emily Prime is busy drawing in a white room when she is interrupted by a time-travelling visitor; a sixth back-up copy of the adult third-generation clone who contacted Emily Prime in the previous episode, known as Emily 6 (voiced by Pott). This back-up Emily has difficulty controlling her emotions and was next in line to be a proper clone of Emily, but believes she lost her identity, and decided to replace her mind with a copy of Emily Prime's mind using a partially-broken neural network on Emily 6's time machine.

The two then start to merge their consciousnesses; inside Emily 6's mind, Emily Prime meets a younger version of Emily 6, and they explore a cave and talk about Emily 6's bracelet, a birthday gift from her sister Felicia. The younger Emily 6 falls asleep and Emily Prime is transported back to the adult Emily 6 in a location in the sub-consciousness called the "Bog of realism". In the bog waters, Emily 6 buried many "glimmers of hope" from her youth that she could not fulfill when she became an adult; one of the glimmers Emily Prime picks up is a dream of becoming a dancer in The Nutcracker ballet.

The two then stumble upon a large raincloud that rains memories into a "Valley of buried memories" below and go to explore it. The memories can be tasted to reveal what they contain, with many of them being inherited from other Emilys. Emily Prime finds a memory of a younger Emily 6 in a large tube with other numbered back-ups, all of whose eyes are closed except for Emily 6. Emily 6 finds a memory that has not happened to either of them yet, and tells Emily Prime not to think of a "baby dinosaur" later. Emily Prime then views three memories of her life where she is unexpectedly visited by Emily 6, and the fourth and seventh back-ups of Emily as they intrusively tour memories of Emily Prime's life to reminisce. Emily 6 finds a memory that transports them to a moment where her younger self kills an insect, describing it as the saddest day of her life and lecturing about the equality of souls before declaring that "clones are better".

Emily Prime spots the stasis tube containing the unconscious body of Felicia floating around a red planet in space. Emily 6 reveals that Felicia is the fifth back-up, Emily 5, having been separated from Emily 6 following Earth's destruction and reprogrammed to store the memories of a deceased wealthy family. They were best friends who both did not want to be named Emily, so they agreed to call Emily 5 "Felicia" and traded their bracelets, revealed to be identification tags, causing the numbers "5" and "6" on their foreheads to be switched. Emily 6 has since been searching for Emily 5, but does not remember the planet she is located at, causing her body to physically distort from thinking about it.

Emily 6's mind then starts breaking down further, believing Emily Prime to be Felicia, and talking about living on the red planet together despite her objections. She tells Emily 6 to close her eyes, which transports Emily Prime back to the younger Emily 6, who ages rapidly back to the adult Emily 6 as she talks about memories of an unknown man who was reportedly accidentally transported by one of the Outernet's time-travelling units to "nowhere," as well as two memories of past Emily's dying in large amounts of snow. They are then transported to the "logic center" in Emily 6's brain, who urges them to escape as soon as possible as any illogical thought could damage her brain. Emily Prime then thinks of a "baby dinosaur," and the system promptly collapses, shutting off Emily 6's mind.

The two are then transported into Emily Prime's mind, where Emily 6 begins to disappear, as the neural network finishes its job of replacing Emily 6's mind with a copy of Emily Prime's mind. To console Emily 6, Emily Prime gives her a ticket to The Nutcracker as a present, and Emily 6 dances to the suite as she contemplates her death. Emily 6 gives Emily Prime her bracelet, telling her to give it to Felicia when they meet again in 230 years, and asks Emily Prime to tell her a story. Emily Prime tells a brief story of a superhero with untapped powers who will save everyone from monsters, before Emily 6 fades from existence.

Emily Prime then returns to her room, with Emily 6 now having the same mind as Emily Prime, and gives her bracelet back to her, declaring herself to be her new sister. Suddenly, the fourth and seventh back-ups of Emily appear, telling Emily 6 that she "can't live in the past and all that" and she says goodbye to Emily Prime.

Episode Three: The Absent Destinations of David Prime (2020)
The ninth back-up of Emily, called Emily 9 (voiced by Pott), transports to the room of an infant named David (voiced by Jack Parrett), and records and implants a short transmission and a larger compressed file into his brain that he will receive later in life. Years later, the adult David Prime is floating in a rocket in space when he receives the transmission in his brain. Emily 9 explains to him that a future clone of him will marry a future clone of Emily, die suddenly, and have his memories harvested by her. However, Emily 9 believes that she is the only clone of Emily to have inherited his memories from her, and asks him to recover his memories from her including information that the original Emily never knew.

David Prime tries to unpack the memory file, but the neural implant technology in his brain determines that there is insufficient space to store the information, so he resorts to deleting many skills he learned in life in order to make enough space to access the information. Another transmission from Emily 9 starts playing, apologizing for the abrupt storage inconveniences before providing David Prime with the coordinates he needs to travel to an abandoned mining planet where she hid his memories.

Upon arrival, she explains further that he will need to walk for about a day across the planet to find an additional package with directions. The further David Prime walks and listens to directions from the transmissions however, the more skills and basic human functions he is forced to delete due to limited storage space, causing him to deteriorate mentally and physically. Along the way, he discovers many scattered corpses of what appears to be himself, which Emily 9 explains may be distant clones of himself from unknown timelines that have intercepted her message and tried and failed to make the trip to her package. Suddenly, a beacon activates in David Prime's brain creating an arrow guiding him to the nearby package, which Emily 9 claims is something only the correct David out of all the corpses of himself would be able to see to guide him to the package. Towards the end of his trek, David Prime is forced to delete his ability to walk and drag himself across the planet's rocky surface to finally reach the package.

The package contains another transmission from Emily 9 where she explains that in 72 years in his time, cloning will become commercially available, with two emergency back-up copies normally being created alongside one clone. After the invention of time travel, the fourth back-up copy of David, David 4, will be employed as a secret agent called a "cleaner" who has the special ability to freely work and travel in a shadow realm in-between individual points of time, as well as perform duties for more sinister powers, most notably secret assassinations. She then explains that David 4 abandons his co-workers and becomes obsessed with the future clone of himself and the woman he marries, the future clone of Emily, planning to assassinate the future clone of himself and take his place in the timeline so he can live the rest of his life with her.

The only reason why his plan is known in the first place is because his roommate, the third-generation clone of David he is based on, read his diary where David 4's plan is fully spelled out after he disappeared the night before. The third-generation clone of David tries to create his own in-between time travel technology to directly confront David 4 before the plan can be carried out, but his experiments fail, and he places himself in a stasis tube for upwards of a century in the hopes that technology will have publicly advanced enough for him to stop the assassination. However, his time in the stasis tube caused him to mentally deteriorate, and he placed a younger clone of himself in a tube for a museum exhibit titled Time is a Prison of Living Things, originally featured in the first episode. The third-generation clone of David eventually disappears from the public record (his now similar hairstyle to the man who was transported nowhere from the second episode suggesting they are the same person) with his final trace being a message written on his wall: "Death is not a destination. It is the absence of one." It is unknown to public knowledge when or where the next generation clone of David is created.

Back in the present, Emily 9 reveals that she stored the clone of David's memories inside a Zorgbot, a robot companion hidden behind a nearby ridge. David Prime immediately recovers the ability to walk and reaches the Zorgbot, but upon trying to activate it finds it has malfunctioned from years of inactivity. 124 years later, a now elderly David Prime living on Earth is shopping on the Internet when he discovers that the company that produces Zorgbots has a 24-hour repair service. At this time, he became increasingly obsessed with rabbits due to a drawing of one that Emily 9 left him as a direction in one of her transmissions as one of his only traces of her, and brought the Zorgbot home with him in his obsession. After the Zorgbot is fixed, he activates it and learns of the last known in-between coordinates David 4 was seen at as well as information on time travel equipment in the hopes of continuing the third-generation clone of David's work and stopping the assassination.

David Prime creates a clone of himself and two back-up copies, David 2 and David 3, killing himself in the process and continuing his lineage. The second-generation clone of David is gradually educated in his youth through a cognitive examination program titled "Godbaby" and as he ages, he remembers the efforts of his lineage. This clone of David and David 2 & 3, now all adults, continue researching and experimenting with time travel technology until the clone of David finally decides now is the time to stop the assassination, and teleports away alone, attracting the attention of his back-ups. At the site of the fourth-generation clone of David's death, David 4 is about to assassinate him when the second-generation clone of David appears behind David 4 and kills him, initiating a small chain of assassinations that start with David 3 appearing and killing the second-generation clone of David, and David 2 appearing and killing David 3 and two cleaners who were drawn to the scene. The last man standing, David 2 carries out the original assassination and kills the fourth-generation clone of David before leaving. In real-time, the fourth-generation clone of David collapses and dies next to the clone of Emily.

David 2 returns home in the past, rents out his apartment and clones himself, creating the third-generation clone of David, drops his unconscious body off in his apartment, and teleports away. By scanning the contents of the Zorgbot, David 2 is able to teleport to Emily 9's time just as she finishes recording the transmission she stored in the Zorgbot, and shortly after he arrives she amicably greets him with "Hello David."

Development
Hertzfeldt had long been interested in science fiction but hesitated making a film set in a genre partly due to not wanting to be confined by it, noting, "it always seems to mean having to tread at least a little bit through overly familiar waters." Still, aspects of science fiction appeared in his film It's Such a Beautiful Day and his graphic novel The End Of The World. He felt that the science fiction genre would especially make sense for his first foray into digital animation.

The design of the film was influenced by science fiction novels and magazine covers of the 1950s and 60s, and by Hertzfeldt wanting the film to have a storybook aesthetic. He worked on the first film simultaneously with his couch gag guest appearance on The Simpsons. Both projects were the first time he had used digital animation in his work. Hertzfeldt was also responsible for the film's sound design and visual effects.

Release and reception

World of Tomorrow
World of Tomorrow premiered at the Sundance Film Festival where it won the Grand Jury Prize for Short Film. World of Tomorrow was released on-demand on Vimeo in March 2015, simultaneously with its continuing theatrical run in film festivals. At the end of its film festival run, the film won over 40 awards. World of Tomorrow won two Crystal Awards from the Annecy Animation Festival: a Special Jury Award and the Audience Award. The film also won two awards from the Ottawa International Animation Festival: Best Script and the Audience Award. It later won the animation industry's Annie Award for Best Animated Short of 2015.

Critical response was universally positive, with Indiewire calling the short film "one of the best films of 2015", The Dissolve naming it "one of the finest achievements in sci-fi in recent memory". World of Tomorrow has an approval rating of 100% on review aggregator website Rotten Tomatoes, based on 8 reviews, and an average rating of 9.80/10.

In 2016, Rolling Stone ranked World of Tomorrow tenth on its list of the "Greatest Animated Movies Ever."

In 2016, the film was nominated for an Academy Award for Best Animated Short Film.

In 2019, the film critics of Indiewire ranked the short film seventeenth on its list of the "100 Best Movies of the Decade".

In 2022, Hertzfeldt uploaded the first episode to YouTube, for all to watch. Subsequent episodes are available to paid members of the YouTube channel.

Episode Two
World of Tomorrow Episode Two: The Burden of Other People's Thoughts premiered in 2017 and received rare "A+" reviews from Indiewire and Collider, where it was described as "another soulful sci-fi masterpiece." The Daily Beast called it "a must-see animated masterpiece" and "one of the best films of the year."

An image from World of Tomorrow Episode Two appears in the album artwork of the Arcade Fire record, We.

Episode Three
World of Tomorrow Episode Three: The Absent Destinations of David Prime was released in 2020 to more positive reviews, including another "A+" from Indiewire. Of the "dreamy, beloved" ongoing series, The Film Stage noted, "Hertzfeldt has crafted what might be the crowning achievement of modern science fiction."

Episode Three was nominated for another Annie Award for Best Animated Short Subject in 2021.

A Blu-ray titled World of Tomorrow: The First Three Episodes was released in 2021, collecting the first three short films plus a booklet of production notes, a deleted scene, and a related new animated short called On Memory.

The first three World of Tomorrow episodes are also currently streaming on Vimeo.

Accolades
As of February 2016, the film has won 42 awards, including:
Grand Jury Prize for Short Film, Sundance Film Festival
Best Animated Short, SXSW
Best Animated Short, Annie Awards
Steven Goldmann Visionary Award, Nashville Film Festival 
Grand Prix, Anifilm Třeboň
Best Film, Fantoche Animation Festival 
Golden Zagreb for Creativity and Artistic Achievement, Animafest Zagreb
Best Script, Ottawa Animation Festival 
Audience Award, Ottawa Animation Festival
Audience Award, Annecy International Animated Film Festival
Special Jury Distinction, Annecy International Animated Film Festival
Grand Jury Prize, St. Cloud Film Festival 
Scientific Merit Award, Imagine Science Film Festival 
Best Short Film, Buenos Aires International Festival of Independent Cinema
Best Animated Short, Dallas International Film Festival
Best Animated Short, Omaha Film Festival
Best Animated Short, Sarasota Film Festival
Audience Award, Vienna Independent Shorts
Audience Award, Glasgow Short Film Festival
Audience Award, Independent Film Festival of Boston
Audience Award, Flatpack Film Festival
Audience Award, Montreal International Animation Film Festival
Special Jury Mention, Regard Sur Le Court Film Festival
Special Jury Mention, Fest Anča International Animation Festival
Best Animated Film, Alhambra Theatre Film Festival
Honorary Mention, Prix Ars Electronica
Jury Prize, Utopiales
Best Animated Short Subject, Annie Awards
88th Academy Awards: Academy Award for Best Animated Short Film (nomination).

In December 2015, Hertzfeldt received a special award from the Austin Film Critics Association, "in celebration of a career of remarkable short filmmaking and contributions to animation spanning two decades, with the 2015 award-winning "World of Tomorrow" being recognized as his best work to date."

References

External links

World of Tomorrow
 
 
 
 A.V. Club review of World of Tomorrow (2015)

Episode Two

Episode Three
 
 
 Indiewire review of World of Tomorrow Episode Three (2020)

2015 films
2010s American animated films
2010s animated short films
2015 short films
Annie Award winners
Short films directed by Don Hertzfeldt
Animated films about time travel
Films about cloning
American animated short films
American science fiction short films
Best Animated Short Subject Annie Award winners
Sundance Film Festival award winners
2010s English-language films